"April 29, 1992 (Miami)" is a song written by American rock band Sublime in 1996 from their eponymous album Sublime. The song title refers to the date of the 1992 Los Angeles riots, of which news spread throughout the United States following the acquittal of four police officers accused in the videotaped beating of Rodney King.

Background
The official title of the song references the date April 29, 1992; however, the lyric is sung as "April 26, 1992." It has been said this was a mistake, but the take was strong enough that the band kept it. Theories have developed about the true integrity of the song's lyrics. The acts of crime including arson, robbery, and vandalism referenced in the lyrics were purportedly committed by Bradley Nowell and other Sublime band members during the 1992 LA riots. The lyrics also offer a justification for the band's participation in the unrest:

Alternate version
After lead singer and guitarist Bradley Nowell's death, the two surviving members of the band released every mix and alternate version that the band had recorded. Along with those recordings, an alternate version of "Miami" was released on their  1997 compilation album Second-hand Smoke titled "April 29, 1992 (Leary)".

Personnel
Bradley Nowell – guitar, vocals
Eric Wilson – bass
Bud Gaugh – percussion
Marshall Goodman - scratches
David Kahne – piano

References

External links
 Sublime official site

1996 songs
Sublime (band) songs
Songs based on American history
Songs written by Bradley Nowell
Songs written by KRS-One
Song recordings produced by David Kahne
Songs about criminals
Songs about crime